Rimau Island is an islet in Southwest Penang Island District, Penang, Malaysia, located off the southern coast of Penang Island. This particular lighthouse, a  round cylindrical cast iron tower with lantern and gallery, as well as a single-storey house for the lightkeeper, serves as a beacon for vessels entering the Penang Strait from the south.

See also
 List of islands of Malaysia

References 

Islands of Penang
Southwest Penang Island District